Kevin Fisher is the name of:

Kevin Fisher (The Young and the Restless), a fictional character
Kevin Fisher (rugby league), New Zealand rugby player and coach
Kevin Fisher (footballer) (born 1995), BVI footballer
Kevin Fisher, a fictional main character from the horror film Final Destination 3

See also
Cevin Fisher (born 1963), American record producer